Palazzo Emo Diedo is a neoclassical palace in Venice, Italy located in the Santa Croce district, overlooking the Grand Canal, opposite the railway station. The building is located near San Simeone Piccolo.

History
The 17th-century palace is an unfinished project by Andrea Tirali. The structure was built for the Emo family. The architectural style contrasts with then dominant Baroque architecture of Baldassarre Longhena. Then the palace passed to ownership of the Diedo family, hence the second name. Today, the palazzo is occupied by a charity organization.

Architecture
The neoclassical façade consists of a ground floor, noble floor, and a loft of substantial size, for a total of three floors and twenty openings. In the central part of the ground floor there is a portal flanked by two quadrangular windows. The portal is covered with rustication. The noble floor offers a tall trifora decorated with a balustrade and large pediment. The façade terminates with a dentiled cornice. The rest of the façade is quite simple and unadorned. There is a garden in the back side of the structure.

References

Houses completed in the 17th century
Emo Diedo
Emo Diedo
Neoclassical architecture in Venice